The University of Connecticut Marching Band (UCMB), nicknamed "The Pride of Connecticut," was formed in 1896 as an all-male ROTC band. It is currently under the direction of Dr. David Mills and assisted by Ricardo Brown and Jessica Dickerson. There are about 300 members in the band. It performs pre-game, halftime, and post-game shows at every home football game at Rentschler Field and travels to at least one away game each season. The band makes other appearances on and off-campus throughout the year, including the Hartford Veteran's Day and Homecoming Parades as well as the USSBA and MAC Championships at John F. Kennedy Stadium (Bridgeport). The band is currently conducting all activities online for the 2020 season.

References

External links
  Official Website

University of Connecticut
Musical groups established in 1896
1896 establishments in Connecticut
Musical groups from Connecticut